Sir Thomas Edward Winnington, 4th Baronet (11 November 1811 – 18 June 1872) was an English Whig politician.

Early life
He was the eldest of three sons and four daughters of the former Joanna Taylor and Sir Thomas Winnington, 3rd Baronet, of Stanford Court, Stanford-on-Teme, Worcestershire. His paternal grandfather was Sir Edward Winnington, 2nd Baronet and his maternal grandfather was John Taylor of Moseley Hall in Worcester.

He was educated at Eton College before matriculating at Christ Church, Oxford.

Career
He succeeded his father as a Member of Parliament for Bewdley, serving first from 1837 to 1847 and again from 1852 to 1868; and as High Sheriff of Worcestershire from 1851 to 1852.

Upon his father's death in September 1839, he inherited all of his father's property and succeeded to the baronetcy.

Personal life
He married Helen Domvile, a daughter of Sir Compton Domvile, 1st Baronet and the former Helena Sarah Trench (a daughter of Frederick Trench, MP for Maryborough). Together, they were the parents of:

 Thomas Edward Winnington (b. 1848).
 Sir Francis Salwey Winnington (1849–1931), who married Jane Spencer-Churchill, a daughter of Lord Alfred Spencer-Churchill and granddaughter of George Spencer-Churchill, 6th Duke of Marlborough.
 Helena Caroline Winnington (1852–1916), who married Hon. Frederick Hanbury-Tracy, MP for Montgomery, a son of Thomas Hanbury-Tracy, 2nd Baron Sudeley, in 1870.

Upon his death on 18 June 1872, he was succeeded by their second son Francis, their eldest son having predeceased him without issue.

References

Sources

External links 
 

1811 births
1872 deaths
Baronets in the Baronetage of Great Britain
High Sheriffs of Worcestershire
Whig (British political party) MPs
Members of the Parliament of the United Kingdom for English constituencies
UK MPs 1837–1841
UK MPs 1841–1847
UK MPs 1852–1857
UK MPs 1857–1859
UK MPs 1859–1865
UK MPs 1865–1868
People from Malvern Hills District